Jorge Montenegro (born 21 September 1968) is a retired Cuban shot putter.

He won the gold medal at the 1986 Central American and Caribbean Junior Championships, the gold medal at the 1989 Central American and Caribbean Championships, the bronze medal at the 1993 Central American and Caribbean Championships, the gold medal at the 1993 Central American and Caribbean Games and the silver medal at the 1995 Pan American Games. He became Cuban champion in 1991, 1992 and 1993 in between Paul Ruiz and Carlos Fandiño.

His personal best put was 19.55 metres, achieved in March 1990 in Havana.

References

1968 births
Living people
Cuban male shot putters
Central American and Caribbean Games gold medalists for Cuba
Pan American Games silver medalists for Cuba
Athletes (track and field) at the 1995 Pan American Games
Pan American Games medalists in athletics (track and field)
Central American and Caribbean Games medalists in athletics
Competitors at the 1993 Central American and Caribbean Games
Medalists at the 1995 Pan American Games
20th-century Cuban people